The climate of Georgia is a humid subtropical climate, with most of the state having short, mild winters and long, hot summers. The Atlantic Ocean on the east coast of Georgia and the hill country in the north impact the state's climate. Winter in Georgia is characterized by mild temperatures and little snowfall around the state, with the potential for snow and ice increasing in the northern parts of the state. Summer daytime temperatures in Georgia often exceed . The state experiences widespread precipitation. Tornadoes and tropical cyclones are common.

Temperatures
Most of Georgia has a sub-tropical climate, with hot and humid summers, except at the highest elevations. Weather conditions in various localities of Georgia depend on how close they are to the Atlantic Ocean or Gulf of Mexico, and their altitude. The areas near the Florida-Georgia border, extending from the Atlantic Ocean westward to the Chattahoochee River, experience the most subtropical weather, similar to that of Florida: hot, humid summers with frequent afternoon thunderstorms and mild, somewhat drier winters. The USDA hardiness zones for Georgia range from zone 6a (-10 °F to -5 °F) in the mountains to zone 9a (20 °F to 25 °F) along the coast.

Despite having moderate weather compared to many other states, Georgia has occasional extreme weather. Heat waves with temperatures over  have often been recorded.

Precipitation

Georgia has had severe droughts in the past, especially in 2007. It also became the wettest tropical cyclone on record for the state of Georgia, eclipsing the record set in 1929. Snowfall, which occurs in most winters, increases in frequency and average amounts per year to the north.

Winter

Southern and southeast areas of the state experience snow much less frequently than other parts of Georgia. The Georgia Piedmont, sometimes referred to as the Blue Ridge province, is somewhat cooler in winter than the coastal areas. The Southern areas of Piedmont may receive snow every other year, while areas close to the foothills get snow a couple of times a year averaging anywhere from a trace up 2" of annual snowfall. The biggest winter threat to the northern piedmont is freezing rain which is rain that freezes on contact. The mountains of Georgia have the coolest climate and most frequent snowfall in the state, although snowfall is less than any other part of the Appalachian Mountains. The exception to this is the mountain areas of Fannin, Gilmer, Pickens, Union, White and Rabun Counties, and surrounding counties which average 3 to 8 inches of snow annually. Mountains, however, can average anywhere from 4-18 inches annually. Elevations over 4000 feet, can have some brutal winters with some storms blanketing the mountains with over a foot of snow. The mountains above 3,500 feet or parts of the Appalachian trail average 10-25 inches of snow in one season. The highest mountain in Georgia, Brasstown Bald (4,784 feet) averages 30–40 inches of snow per season.

Winter weather watches are issued when there is a "50 percent or greater chance of significant and damaging accumulations of ice during freezing rain situations"; these watches are normally issued 12 to 48 hours in advance. A winter storm warning for an ice storm means that icy conditions are "occurring, imminent, or have a very high probability of occurring". These warnings are usually issued when there is an 80 percent or greater chance of meeting ice storm conditions.

Blizzards in Georgia are rare.  The last blizzard the state had was in March 1993.

Winter in South Georgia, which lasts from December to January, is much more mild.

Winters in Georgia are determined by the Pacific Ocean. During El Niño, the jet stream is located along the Southern U.S., allowing for colder and wetter conditions with greater snowfall. The opposite phase, La Niña, keeps the jet stream farther north, thus winters are warmer and drier across Georgia.

Spring
Weather during springtime in North Georgia and the mountains changes from day to day and year to year. Early spring in the North Georgia Mountains can be very chilly during the day; average highs are near .

Summer
Summers are hot and humid with temperatures in the afternoons that reach, on average, to near . Overnight lows fall to near   and there is usually an 8 °F (4 °C)  difference in temperature between the mountains and Atlanta. While humidity in North Georgia, especially in the mountains, can be high it is not as high as it is in South Georgia.

Tropical cyclones

Although Georgia experiences many tropical cyclones, it only rarely experiences a direct hurricane strike due to its fairly small coastline. The last hurricane to directly affect the Georgia coastline was Hurricane David in 1979. The last major hurricane (Category 3 or higher) to hit the Georgia coast directly was in 1898. More common are hurricanes which strike the Florida Panhandle, weaken over land, and bring tropical storm or hurricane-force winds and heavy rain to the Georgia interior (especially the southwestern areas), as well as hurricanes that come close to the Georgia coastline, brushing the coast on their way up to hit the Carolinas.

Tornadoes

Georgia is one of the leading states in incidents of tornadoes though they are rarely stronger than  F1 .  Southwestern and northern sections of the state have historically reported the largest amount of tornadoes.  The areas closest to the Florida border report F0 and F1 tornadoes associated with summer afternoon thunderstorms.  However, tornadoes of F3 intensity or greater within Georgia are uncommon, with three events reported on average each year.

Fall
Georgia's autumns are normally sunny and cool. September and October, the driest months of the year, qualify as "Indian Summer" weather with temperatures that are near  during the daytime. At night, the temperature drops to near . The first freeze of the year normally falls within November, except in the northern mountains, where it occurs in October.

Statistics for selected cities

Climate change

See also
List of wettest known tropical cyclones in Georgia

Notes

References

 
Georgia